The following are lists of Malayalam films of the 1980s by year.

 Malayalam films of 1980
 Malayalam films of 1981
 Malayalam films of 1982
 Malayalam films of 1983
 Malayalam films of 1984
 Malayalam films of 1985
 Malayalam films of 1986
 Malayalam films of 1987
 Malayalam films of 1988
 Malayalam films of 1989

References

1980s
Lists of 1980s films
Malayalam